Selaginella martensii, the variegated spikemoss or Martens's spike moss, is a lycophyte in the Selaginellaceae family. It is native to Mexico and Central America.

References
 GBIF entry
 UniProt entry
 NCBI entry
 Jakob Schneller, Hans Gerber, and Alex Zuppiger, "Speed and force of spore ejection in Selaginella martensii", Botanica Helvetica, Birkhäuser Basel, Volume 118, Number 1 / June, 2008. ISSN 0253-1453 (Print) 1420-9063 (Online).
 JA Jernstedt, EG Cutter, EM Gifford EM, "Angle meristem origin and development in Selaginella martensii", Ann. Bot. 69, pages 351–63. 1992.

martensii